John Arthur William Fry (born 13 November 1961) is a former English cricketer.  Fry was a right-handed batsman.  He was born in Streatham, London.

Fry represented the Surrey Cricket Board in List A cricket.  His debut List A match came against Norfolk in the 1999 NatWest Trophy.  From 1999 to 2002, he represented the Board in 4 List A matches, the last of which came against the Essex Cricket Board in the 2nd round of the 2003 Cheltenham & Gloucester Trophy which was held in 2002.  In his 5 List A matches, he scored 161 runs at a batting average of 40.25, with two half centuries and a high score of 90.  In the field he took 3 catches.

References

External links
John Fry at Cricinfo
John Fry at CricketArchive

1961 births
Living people
People from Streatham
Cricketers from Greater London
English cricketers
Surrey Cricket Board cricketers